José Villarreal is a paralympic track and field athlete from Venezuela competing mainly in category T12 sprint events.

Biography
Although Jose competed in the 100m, 200m and 400m at the 2004 Summer Paralympics, it was only when he ran as part of the Venezuelan T11-13 4 × 100 m relay team that he won his only Paralympic medal, a bronze.

References

Paralympic athletes of Venezuela
Athletes (track and field) at the 2004 Summer Paralympics
Paralympic bronze medalists for Venezuela
Living people
Medalists at the 2004 Summer Paralympics
Visually impaired sprinters
Venezuelan male sprinters
Year of birth missing (living people)
Place of birth missing (living people)
Paralympic medalists in athletics (track and field)
20th-century Venezuelan people
21st-century Venezuelan people
Paralympic sprinters